"Lost" is a song  recorded by Canadian country music group Hunter Brothers. It was the lead single off their second studio album State of Mind. The track was co-written by Brad Rempel, Cary Barlowe, Jesse Frasure, and Jon Nite. It became the group’s first #1 hit on the Billboard Canada Country chart, and was awarded Single of the Year at the 2019 Saskatchewan Music Awards.

Critical reception
Nanci Dagg of Canadian Beats Media said the track "has an upbeat melody and delightful lyrics  – the kind you want to dance to and sing along with, no matter where you are when you’re listening to it" and a "love song that catches you right from the get-go, wants you to get lost in the presence of someone new in your life. It’s an unanticipated excitement that you feel when you do and these brothers have captured that in this song." Cashbox Canada wrote that the song is "an upbeat, addictive track that captivates the listener" with "the brothers’ brilliantly-synched harmonies".

Commercial performance
"Lost" reached a peak of number 1 on the Billboard Canada Country chart dated April 13, 2019, marking the brothers' first chart-topper. It also peaked at number 100 on the Billboard Canadian Hot 100 and was their first charting entry there. "Lost" was certified Gold by Music Canada on November 22, 2019, with over 40,000 sales. As of November 2020, the song had received over 2.5 million streams through Spotify. The song was the most-spun Canadian song on country radio in Canada in 2019, according to Mediabase.

Music video
The official music video for "Lost" was directed by Ben Knechtel and premiered November 2, 2018.

Chart performance

Certifications

References

2018 songs
2018 singles
Hunter Brothers songs
Open Road Recordings singles
Songs written by Brad Rempel
Songs written by Cary Barlowe
Songs written by Jesse Frasure
Songs written by Jon Nite